Simone Bolelli was the defending champion, but he did not participate this year. He played in Bucharest instead.

Taro Daniel won the title, defeating Filippo Volandri in the final, 6–3, 1–6, 6–4.

Seeds

Draw

Finals

Top half

Bottom half

References
 Main Draw
 Qualifying Draw

Citta di Vercelli - Trofeo Multimed - Singles
2015 Singles